Sikhism has no specific teachings about homosexuality and the Sikh holy scripture, the Guru Granth Sahib, does not explicitly mention heterosexuality, homosexuality or bisexuality. The universal goal of a Sikh is to have no hate or animosity to any person, regardless of factors like race, caste, color, creed or gender.

Statements and teachings of Guru Granth Sahib
Giani Joginder Singh Vedanti of the Akal Takht (the temporal Sikh authority in India) has condemned homosexuality. In March 2005, he told visiting Sikh-Canadian Members of Parliament (MPs) that they had a religious duty to oppose same-sex marriage: "The basic duty of Sikh MPs in Canada should be to support laws that stop this kind of practice [homosexuality], because there are thousands of Sikhs living in Canada, to ensure that Sikhs do not fall prey to this practice".

The divide between supporters and opponents of LGBT rights has become increasingly clear, creating a largely generational rift between older conservatives and younger liberals. Many Sikhs believe there is nothing wrong with being LGBT or supporting LGBT rights more generally, including same-sex marriage. These Sikhs believe that the view of some preachers in the Akal Takht is flawed.

The Sikh Rehat Maryada emphasizes the importance of a family lifestyle, and many Sikhs believe that since same-sex partners can't reproduce and make a family that homosexuality should be condemned. This heteronormative way of viewing the family is questioned by those who believe Sikhism is more tolerant of people not viewed as “normal”. Many Sikh adherents believe the Rehat Maryada is meant to be interpreted and applied to life liberally rather than treated as a binding contract.

Homosexuality in scripture
According to the Sikh Council UK,

Current discussion
Although the topic of homosexuality in Sikhism is taboo, the younger generation is looking to the internet for answers. The internet has become a new way for young Sikhs, born inside and outside of India, to discuss religion and current issues anonymously. The internet allows people access to information without the discomfort of talking about it within the community. The internet has become a tool for young Sikhs to get information about current issues that may not be discussed directly within their communities.

Certain individuals use the internet to discuss homosexuality in the community.  A Sikh, Manjinder Singh, describes his experiences as a gay Sikh man, using his own platform on YouTube to reach a wider audience in an attempt to generate dialogue in the community that begins by defining what it means to be queer. In one of his videos, he has a conversation with his mother about homosexuality in Punjabi. This video defines what it means to be gay, lesbian, bisexual, and being transgender in Punjabi and is targeted to the audience that doesn't necessarily understand the different sexual and gender identities. Other famous Sikh YouTube stars such Sikh Canadian comedian Jus Reign (Jasmeet Singh), and Lilly Singh have openly voiced their support for LGBT rights. In fact, Lilly Singh announced her bisexuality on Youtube.

In January 2005, the Jathedar (custodian) of Sri Akal Takht Sahib, Amritsar, Punjab, India, the highest seat of Sikh temporal-religious (miri-piri) authority for interpreting Sikh teachings, issued an edict denouncing same-sex marriages, and urging the worldwide Sikh community not to allow such marriages to take place at any Gurdwara." This was in response to clarification sought from Sikhs in Canada as similar legislation was being discussed and consulted on in Canada.

Identity

Identity formation
Both the Sikh identity and sexual identities affect a person's self concept and how they relate to their community. Like other religions, Sikhism strives to cultivate a sense of identity through religious practices, but in Sikhism, there is a shared common physical identity too. Through the process of identity formation, people begin to build a sense of individuality that allows them to find communities of people that they identify with. Identity formation at the intersection of Sikh and sexual identities has not been a focus of many studies. As the Sikh diaspora starts forming in places like Britain, some researchers are interested in understanding how these ethnic, religious, and sexual identities affect one's self-concept.  Many queer Sikhs find it difficult to reconcile their religious identity with their sexual identity.

Narrative
Some  research is aiming to understand how the Sikh narrative and the narrative of sexuality coincide and conflict with one another. In an article written by David Mair for the University of Birmingham, David examines the life narrative of an openly gay, practicing Sikh named Daljeet. This study aimed to understand how clashing narratives affect one's self-concept and relationship to the community at large. After having an in-depth conversation with Daljeet, David found that many of the struggles that he faced were because of the clash of narratives in his own life. Daljeet's narratives of Indian masculinity, ethnicity, religion, and sexuality conflicted with one another and his self-concept is deeply affected by it. Those who do not conform to hetero-normative and binary definitions of gender and sexuality are tasked with creating a new narrative that incorporates all aspects of their identity in an encompassing way.

See also

Human male sexuality
Human female sexuality
Human sexuality

References

External links
Invisibility: Without Recognition, There is No Support
Sikhism and Homosexuality
SARBAT.NET – Website for Lesbian, Gay, Bisexual and Transgender Sikhs around the world
ProjectNaad.com – Sikhism Resource Centre examines homosexuality

LGBT and religion
Sexual orientation